Belledune (2011 population: 1,548) is a Canadian village that straddles both Restigouche County and Gloucester County, New Brunswick.

The community of Belledune was created through the amalgamation of Jacquet River, Armstrong Brook, and Belledune in 1994.  The community dubbed itself a "Supervillage" after this amalgamation. Belledune's population meets the requirements as a "Town" under the Municipalities Act of the Province of New Brunswick, but it has not requested a change in municipal status.

Belledune is one of the few municipalities not significantly affected by the province's 2023 local governance reforms.

History

The village was first settled by François Guitard around 1815. Guitard was originally from Paris, France and after fighting in Napoleon's army, he later defected to the British army. He and his wife Marie emigrated to Canada and after a brief settling in Riviere-Ouelle, Quebec, were granted land in New Brunswick. Guitard had also helped map the New Brunswick coastline with the British military. Settlers from the Miramichi Valley moved towards Belledune after the 1825 Great Miramichi Fire.

Economy
Belledune underwent unprecedented development during the era of premier Louis Robichaud (1960's) when a major regional port was built to service various industries on the north shore of New Brunswick.

The first major industrial projects at the port included in 1966 a lead and zinc smelter, now owned by Glencore with a nominal production of 120,000 tonnes per year. built in support of the lead and zinc mines opened south of Bathurst during the 1950s in the Bathurst Mining Camp.  The smelter has managed to extract silver from its imported silver lead concentrates, and in 2011 produced 400mt of pure silver valued at 448M$; the company proposes to increase its silver production to 700mt.  The current permit to operate is file number I-7107.

NB Power opened the Belledune Generating Station, a coal-fired thermal generating station, at the port in 1993.

Demographics 

Language

Notable people

See also
List of communities in New Brunswick

References

External links
 Village of Belledune

Communities in Gloucester County, New Brunswick
Villages in New Brunswick